The following lists events that happened in 1979 in Iceland.

Incumbents
President – Kristján Eldjárn
Prime Minister – Ólafur Jóhannesson, Benedikt Gröndal

Events

Births

11 February – Hanna Guðrún Stefánsdóttir, handball player
26 February – Bjarni Guðjónsson, footballer
26 February – Daníel Bjarnason, composer and conductor
11 June – Helgi Sveinsson, Paralympian athlete
15 July – Edda Garðarsdóttir, footballer
28 July – Birgitta Haukdal, singer
8 August – Guðjón Valur Sigurðsson, handball player.
25 October – Björn Thorfinnsson, chess player
28 November – Jóhannes Ásbjörnsson, TV and radio show host

Deaths
22 February – Þorsteinn Þorsteinsson, economist (b. 1880)

References

 
1970s in Iceland
Iceland
Iceland
Years of the 20th century in Iceland